The Old Dark House is a 1932 American pre-Code comedy horror film directed by James Whale. Based on the 1927 novel Benighted by J.B. Priestley, the film features an ensemble cast that includes Boris Karloff, Melvyn Douglas, Gloria Stuart, Charles Laughton, Lilian Bond, Ernest Thesiger, Raymond Massey and Eva Moore. Set in interwar Wales, the film follows five travellers who seek shelter from a violent storm in the decaying country house home of the eccentric Femm family.

The adaptation rights to Priestley's novel, a social commentary on contemporary British class structures, were acquired by Universal Pictures at Whale's insistence following the completion of Frankenstein (1931) and during development on The Invisible Man (1933). The screenplay was written by Benn W. Levy, who had previously scripted Waterloo Bridge (1931) for Whale and Universal, with uncredited contributions by The Invisible Mans R. C. Sheriff, and serves as a largely faithful adaptation of the story. Whale was entrusted with selecting the film's largely British cast, several of whose members were theatre colleagues of his with minimal film experience, and would appear in several of his later films.

The Old Dark House failed to match the contemporary critical and commercial success of Whale's other films, and was withdrawn from circulation after Universal lost the rights to Priestley's novel, which was adapted for film again in 1963 by William Castle for Columbia Pictures and Hammer Film Productions. Initially deemed a lost film, Whale's colleague Curtis Harrington eventually succeeded in recovering most of its original elements, which were restored by the George Eastman House. With the re-evaluation of Whale's filmography, The Old Dark House has garnered widespread critical acclaim, and is recognized as both a cult classic and one of the director's most significant works. It was placed at number 71 on a Time Out poll of the best horror films.

Plot 
Philip Waverton, his wife Margaret and their friend Roger Penderel are lost while driving at night in a heavy storm. They come upon an old house in the Welsh countryside where they receive shelter by Horace Femm and his sister Rebecca. Horace fears that the storm will trap the guests inside. He also warns them that their mute butler Morgan is a dangerous, heavy drinker. As Rebecca escorts Margaret to a bedroom to change clothes, she tells her about the Femm family, which Rebecca says was sinful and godless. She accuses Margaret of being sinful as well. Rebecca reveals that her 102-year-old father, Sir Roderick Femm, still lives in the house.

During dinner, the group are joined by Sir William Porterhouse and a chorus girl with the stage name Gladys DuCane, who also seek refuge from the storm. As the group chats by the fireplace, Gladys reveals her real last name is Perkins. Roger and Gladys go to retrieve some whiskey from his car. The electric lights go out and Rebecca tells Horace to get a lamp from an upstairs landing. Horace is afraid to go upstairs, so Philip goes instead. As he fetches the lamp, he notices a locked room and hears a voice coming from another room. William goes to help Rebecca close a window, leaving Margaret alone. Morgan, now drunk, attacks her and chases her up the stairs to Philip, who is coming down with the lamp. Philip throws the lamp at Morgan, knocking him down the stairs.

Roger and Gladys begin flirting while they drink and smoke. Gladys says her relationship with William is platonic, and suggests she should live with Roger instead. They go back to the house, where they wake up William and tell him about their new romance. Meanwhile, Philip and Margaret go into the room where he heard the voice; they find Roderick Femm there. He warns them about his eldest son, Saul, a crazed pyromaniac kept in the locked room. Philip and Margaret discover that Morgan has let Saul out; they go downstairs to warn the other guests. Morgan comes downstairs and charges at Margaret. Philip and William drag Morgan into the kitchen while Rebecca flees to her bedroom. Roger tells Margaret and Gladys to hide in a closet. Saul comes downstairs and knocks Roger out. Saul steals a burning branch from the fireplace and sets fire to a curtain before Roger awakes. They fight and fall off a landing; Saul is killed and Roger injured. Morgan breaks out of the kitchen and returns to the main room. He frees Margaret and Gladys from the closet before taking Saul's body upstairs.

By morning, the storm has subsided. Saul's attempt at burning the house has caused little damage. Philip and Margaret leave to get an ambulance, while Gladys and William stay behind to tend to Roger's injuries. Upon awakening, Roger asks Gladys to marry him, and she happily kisses him in response.

Cast 
 Boris Karloff as Morgan
 Melvyn Douglas as Roger Penderel
 Raymond Massey as Philip Waverton
 Gloria Stuart as Margaret Waverton
 Charles Laughton as Sir William Porterhouse
 Lilian Bond as Gladys DuCane/Perkins
 Ernest Thesiger as Horace Femm
 Eva Moore as Rebecca Femm
 Brember Wills as Saul Femm
 Elspeth Dudgeon as Sir Roderick Femm (credited as "John Dudgeon")

Development and production 
Universal Studios producer Carl Laemmle Jr. invited screenwriter Benn Levy from England to Universal City after being impressed with Levy's screenplay for Waterloo Bridge (1931), which was also directed by James Whale. Levy was loaned to Paramount Pictures, where he worked on the screenplay for Devil and the Deep. When Levy finished work on the film, he returned to Universal to start work on The Old Dark House. The film is based on the novel Benighted (1927) by J. B. Priestley, about post-World War I disillusionment. It was published in the United States under the same title as the film. Adapted for the screen by R. C. Sherriff and Benn Levy, the motion picture follows the original plot of the book, while adding levels of comedy to the story.

Original release and reception 
The Old Dark House was previewed in early July 1932. In the United States, Variety and The Hollywood Filmograph gave the film negative reviews, with Variety calling it a "somewhat inane picture". All nine of the New York City dailies gave the film positive reviews.

The New York Times praised the film, stating, "there is a wealth of talent in this production... like Frankenstein, [it] had the advantage of being directed by James Whale, who again proves his ability." The film did good business at the box-office in the first week of release, but later suffered through negative word of mouth. It was booked for three weeks at the Rialto Theatre in New York City, but the audience turn-out dropped to less than half in its second week and the film was pulled after ten days. The film performed better in the United Kingdom, where it broke house records at the Capitol Theatre in London. It was re-issued into theaters in 1939.

Rediscovery and reputation 

In 1957, Universal Studios lost the rights to the original story, and a remake was released in 1963, directed by William Castle and co-produced with Hammer Film Productions. For many years, the original version was considered a lost film and gained a tremendous reputation as one of the pre-eminent gothic horror films. Director Curtis Harrington, a friend of Whale, helped to rediscover The Old Dark House, having repeatedly asked Universal Studios to locate the film negative. Harrington eventually discovered a print of the film in the vaults of Universal in 1968. He persuaded the George Eastman House film archive to finance a new duplicate negative of the poorly kept first reel, and restore the rest of the film.

Modern reception has been more generally favorable than reviews in 1932, with the film-ranking website Rotten Tomatoes reporting that 96% of its listed critics have given the film positive reviews, based upon 26 reviews with an average rating of 8.37 out of 10. Ali Catterall of Channel 4 referred to the film as "Impressively atmospheric and hilariously grim," and Time Out London praised the film; "Whale manages to parody the conventions of the dark house horror genre as he creates them, in which respect the film remains entirely modern." Karl Williams of the film database Allmovie wrote, "by the 1960s [the film had] attained a grail-like status among fans of director James Whale ... The Old Dark House came to be reconsidered a cult gem, part of the renewal of interest in Whale's talents many years after his creative peak."

In the early 2010s, Time Out conducted a poll of several authors, directors, actors and critics who had worked within the horror genre to determine their top horror films. The Old Dark House placed at number 71 on their top 100 list.

The film also served as an inspiration for The Rocky Horror Picture Show and Thundercrack!.

See also 
 List of American films of 1932
 List of rediscovered films

References

Works cited

External links 

 
 
 
 
 

1932 films
1932 horror films
1930s comedy horror films
American comedy horror films
American black-and-white films
Films based on British novels
Films directed by James Whale
Films set in country houses
Films set in Wales
American haunted house films
Universal Pictures films
1930s rediscovered films
Rediscovered American films
1930s English-language films
1930s American films
Films produced by Carl Laemmle Jr.